The 2011 Clásica de San Sebastián was the 31st edition of the Clásica de San Sebastián, a single-day cycling race. It was the eighteenth event of the 2011 UCI World Tour season.

Similar to his late race attacks to win the Ardennes classics earlier in the year, 's Philippe Gilbert accelerated away from the pack with  remaining in the race and caught and passed 's Carlos Barredo on the road. Barredo could not hold Gilbert's pace and thus Gilbert opened up a gap of over ten seconds that he held to the finish, to secure his fourteenth victory of the season.

Teams and riders
As the race was held under the auspices of the UCI World Tour, all eighteen ProTour teams were invited automatically. Three additional wildcard invitations were given – ,  and  – to form the event's 21-team peloton.

The 21 teams invited to the race were:

Teams consisted of up to eight riders, and 168 riders started the event. The event took place less than a week after the conclusion of the 2011 Tour de France, and many of the riders who took part in that event, contested the race.

Results

References

Clásica de San Sebastián
San Sebastian
Classica de San Sebastian